This page includes the discography of the Greek-French artist Nikos Aliagas.

Albums
All the albums listed underneath were released and charted in Greece and Cyprus.

Singles
(Not all singles were released on CD)

 2007 - "Zileia Monaksia" feat. Helena Paparizou
 2007 - "Mine Ki Allo (Ain't No Sunshine)"
 2008 - "Xara Mou"

Music videos
 2007 - "Zileia Monaksia" feat. Helena Paparizou
 2007 - "Mine Ki Allo (Ain't No Sunshine)"

Video albums
 2007 - Nikos Aliagas & Friends : Rendez-Vous

References

External links
 IFPI Greece official website with Greek charts

Discographies of Greek artists
Pop music discographies